Viggo Johansen (3 January 1851 – 18 December 1935) was a Danish painter and active member of the group of Skagen Painters who met every summer in the north of Jutland. He was one of Denmark's most prominent painters in the 1890s.

Early life and education
As a boy, Johansen already had a talent for drawing which was recognized by Wilhelm Marstrand.  He studied at the Royal Danish Academy of Fine Arts from 1868 to 1875, specializing in figure painting, but did not pass the graduation examination.

Career
His earliest works are from Hornbæk where he painted between 1872 and 1876 with works such as Et Maaltid and Nabokonens Besøg.

He first became associated with the Skagen Painters in 1875, encouraged by his fellow students Karl Madsen and Michael Ancher.

From 1885, he exhibited in Paris; there he was inspired by Claude Monet, particularly in his use of colour as can be seen in his painting Christian Bindslev er syg (Christian Bindslev is ill, 1890), which also shows the influence of Christian Krohg, one of the other Skagen painters. After his return from Paris, his paintings took on lighter tones; he had noted the absence of black in the works of the French artists and considered his own earlier works too dark by comparison.  Nevertheless, Johansen is remembered particularly for the subdued lighting effects of his interiors — many of which were painted after his visit to Paris  — as in his Glade jul (Merry Christmas, 1891), Aftenpassiar (Evening Talk, 1886) and Aftenselskab i kunstnerens hjem (Evening Gathering at the Artist's Home, 1899) and his scenes of domestic family life, but he also painted landscapes (at Skagen, at Tisvilde, and at his childhood home, the fishing port of Dragør outside Copenhagen), still lifes and portraits. After a falling out with P.S. Krøyer in 1891, Johansen's relationship with the Anchers was strained and he and his family did not visit Skagen for several years.

From 1888 to 1906, he taught at the Artists Academy's School for Women. He then became a professor there until 1920 and, for a time, was one of its directors.

Private life

It is said that in Skagen, he showed just as much interest in playing Mozart on the hotel piano or Gluck on the church organ as in painting. He married Anna Ancher's cousin Martha Møller in 1880. Martha often served as a model, for example in Køkkeninteriør (Kitchen interior, 1884) — which may have been inspired by Anna Ancher's similarly composed The Girl in the Kitchen — Sovekammerscene (Bedroom Scene, 1885) and Børnene vaskes (Washing the Children, 1888) which were painted partially on the basis of photographs.

Viggo Johansen's daughter, Ellen, was also a painter. She married the painter Johannes Ottesen.

Awards

In 1886, Johansen was awarded the Exhibition Medal for the painting Evening Talk. In 1889, many of the Skagen artists received awards at Exposition Universelle in Paris; Johansen won a Gold Medal for Børnene vaskes.

Gallery

Notes

References

Sources

External links 

19th-century Danish painters
Danish male painters
20th-century Danish painters
Artists from Copenhagen
Skagen Painters
1851 births
1935 deaths
Royal Danish Academy of Fine Arts alumni
Directors of the Royal Danish Academy of Fine Arts
Recipients of the Thorvaldsen Medal
19th-century Danish male artists
20th-century Danish male artists